Alfonso Nelson Silva Pacheco (born 8 October 1944) is a Uruguayan-born Colombian footballer. He played in three matches for the Colombia national football team in 1975. He was also part of Colombia's squad for the 1975 Copa América tournament.

References

External links
 

1944 births
Living people
Colombian footballers
Colombia international footballers
Place of birth missing (living people)
Association football forwards
Danubio F.C. players
Liverpool F.C. (Montevideo) players
Sportivo Italiano footballers
Club Atlético Tigre footballers
Rosario Central footballers
Atlético Nacional footballers
Deportes Quindío footballers
Cúcuta Deportivo footballers
Atlético Junior footballers
Deportivo Táchira F.C. players
América de Cali footballers
Uruguayan footballers
Uruguayan expatriate footballers
Expatriate footballers in Argentina
Colombian expatriate footballers
Expatriate footballers in Venezuela
Colombian football managers
Deportivo Táchira F.C. managers
Deportes Tolima managers
Colombian expatriate football managers
Expatriate football managers in Venezuela